Pier Giorgio Di Cicco (July 5, 1949 - December 22, 2019) was an Italian-Canadian poet. In 2005 he became the second Poet Laureate of Toronto.

Born in Arezzo, Italy, his family immigrated to Canada in 1952. Di Cicco was brought up in several North American cities, among them Baltimore, Maryland, Montreal, Quebec and Toronto, Ontario. In the early 1970s he attended the University of Toronto.  While working part-time as a bartender at the university, he began to publish poems in little magazines. He has since written 13 books of poetry and in 1978 edited a volume of verse by Italian-Canadian poets, Roman Candles which became a seminal volume for the birth of Italian-Canadian literature.

His poems, consisting of deep images in stanzas of free verse -  with lines consisting of irregular numbers of syllables and (hypothetical) feet - often referred to di Cicco's immigrant and Italian-family experiences. In books like Flying Deeper Into the Century (1982) and The Tough Romance (1979) he communicated a modern, sensitive awareness of the  confusing welter of 20th-century life. Di Cicco's unmetrical but imagistic lines flowed on, often with cumulative power, to release their tension at the end of their stanzas.

Di Cicco gradually felt called to a Catholic religious life. Reducing his output of verse, he spent a period in an Augustinian monastery north of Toronto. Di Cicco then undertook religious studies and became a friar with a parish in Brampton, Ontario. In the 1990s he resumed writing and publishing poems, producing a selected volume and several others. In 2005, he was chosen Poet Laureate of Toronto; he published a poem weekly in The Toronto Star Sunday newspaper. In 2004-5 he taught at the University of Toronto. The writer and critic Joseph Pivato edited, Pier Giorgio Di Cicco: Essays on His Works (2011), an important analysis of his poetry.

His latest book (2018) is entitled Wishipedia.

Selected bibliography 

We are the Light Turning - 1976
Dancing in the House of Cards - 1977
The Sad Facts - 1977
The Circular Dark - 1977
A Burning Patience - 1978
Roman Candles - 1978 (editor)
The Tough Romance - 1979
Flying Deeper Into the Centuries"' - 1982Dark to Light - 1983Women We Never See Again - 1984Post-sixties Nocturne - 1985Virgin Sciences - 1986The Tough Romances - 1990Living in Paradise - 2001The Honeymoon Wilderness - 2002The Dark Time of Angels - 2003Dead Men of the Fifties - 2004The Visible Worlds - 2006Municipal Minds: Manifestos for the Creative Cities - 2007Early Voices: Flying Deeper into the Century & Virgin Science - 2009Names of Blessings'' - 2009

References

1949 births
2019 deaths
Canadian male poets
Italian emigrants to Canada
Poets Laureate of Toronto
21st-century Canadian poets
20th-century Canadian poets
20th-century Canadian male writers
21st-century Canadian male writers
Poet priests